The Billboard Latin Music Award for Hot Latin Songs Artist of the Year (formerly Hot Latin Tracks Artist of the Year) is an honor presented annually at the Billboard Latin Music Awards, a ceremony which honors "the most popular albums, songs, and performers in Latin music, as determined by the actual sales, radio airplay, streaming and social data that informs Billboards weekly charts." The award is given to best performing artists on Billboards Hot Latin Songs chart, which measures the most popular Latin songs in the United States. The Hot Latin Songs chart was based solely on radio airplay since its induction in 1986 until October 2012, when it started to also measure digital sales and streaming activity. In 2010, the category was split into three: Male, Female, and Duo or Group.

Recipients

1994–2009

Since 2010

Male

Female

Duo or Group

Records

Most nominations

General
From 1994 to 2009

Male
From 2010 ongoing

Female
From 2010 ongoing

Duo or Group
From 2010 ongoing

Most awards

General
From 1994 to 2009

Male
From 2010 ongoing

Female
From 2010 ongoing

Duo or Group
From 2010 ongoing

See also
Billboard Music Award for Top Latin Artist

References

Awards established in 1994
Billboard Latin Music Awards
Song awards
1994 establishments in the United States